Axel Valdimar Tulinius (6 June 1865 – 8 December 1937) was an Icelandic politician. He was a member of Alþingi from 1900 to 1901 for the Progress Party (Icelandic: Framfaraflokkurinn). In 1912, he became the first president of the Sports Association of Iceland where he served until 1926. He was the first Chief Scout of Bandalag íslenskra skáta (Icelandic Boy and Girl Scout Association), having served from 1925 until 1938.

Death
Axel died in Copenhagen on 8 December 1937 after illness.

References

External links
Alþingi bio

1865 births
1937 deaths
Axel V. Tulinius
Axel V. Tulinius
Axel V. Tulinius
Chief Scouts